Christopher J. Scott is a television, film and theater producer in New York City.

Early career
He started his career in 1994 as a production coordinator with CBS, going on to work as a production manager and line producer with USA Networks and The Sci-Fi Channel. Scott later became a flagship employee for several of the converging new media and entertainment agencies in the 90's including Razorfish and Modern Media/Poppee Tyson.

Ignition Point Studios
Scott went on to start Ignition Point Studios, a full service film and television production company. As co-founder and Director, Scott maintained $3.1 million in sales and continued to manage Film and Television projects for top clients like New Line Cinema, CBS, Sony, Calvin Klein, BBDO, PBS, USA Networks, GT Direct and Arista Records.

Additionally Scott and Ignition Point were nominated for an Emmy for the PBS documentary “Desi.”

Red Sky Pictures
Scott later became a co-founder/partner in the production company Red Sky Pictures, additionally serving as a writer and director. Latest projects include TV series “A Moment of Luxury” for PBS, the TV series “Retail Therapy”, for the Voyages Television, the broadcast series “Hip Hop Hold Em’” for The CW, and the independent feature films “Falling Star” and "Staten Island."

Great Scott Films
Christopher and his brother Glen L. Scott have recently launched Great Scott Films, Inc., a full service production and post production company located on West 42nd Street in Times Square. Continuing on from Red Sky, Great Scott in its first eighteen months have already accumulated over 2.5 million in sales, launched a PBS series and began production on its second feature film. In addition, GSF is launching a new documentary series MTV.

Films and documentaries
As a narrative film director he made the 2006 festival short film “You and I,” (2006 Cannes Film Festival) national spots for clients like Hasbro, ESPN, International Baseball Federation, Major League Baseball, National Geographic, Grey Advertising, Bayer and Juvederm. In addition, he wrote and directed the Feature Film documentary “Snow Blind,” which premiered December 7’ in theaters nationwide.

Scott is also a producer of the 2010 feature film Escape to Donegal.

Controversy over Play

In 2010 Scott and his partners suddenly closed the off-broadway play "Manigma" starring Tony Award winner Michael Aronov.  

From the New York Times: "Despite an acclaimed performance and strong ticket sales, “Manigma” closed four weeks early when promised investor funds never arrived. “The only smile on my face these days is when I’m up there,” Mr. Aronov said, heading into what was suddenly his closing week."  

Scott's representatives replied "Although the play had a prior successful run that created a lot of enthusiasm, this did not translate to a bigger stage at that time. The best decision was made to avoid any future losses. There was nothing but respect for the producers and talent and it was failure on our part to get the right backing "Manigma" sincerely needed."

References 

Living people
Year of birth missing (living people)
Television producers from New York City
American directors